Grom may refer to:

Military 
 JW GROM, a Polish special forces unit
 ORP Grom, several ships of the Polish Navy
 Grom (missile), a Polish anti-aircraft missile
 A Yugoslav/Serbian version of the Kh-23 (AS-9 'Kyle') air-to-surface missile
 2A28 Grom, a Russian low pressure gun
 Hrim-2, a missile being developed by Ukraine

People 
 Franc Grom, Slovenian artist

Other uses 
 Gragjanska оpcija za Makedonija (Citizen Option for Macedonia), a political party in North Macedonia
 Grom (company), an Italian gelato company
 Honda Grom, a motorcycle
 Grom (album), an album by Behemoth, a Polish black/death metal band
 GROM, Graphics Read Only Memory, a type of memory used in the TI-99/4A Home Computer
 Grommet (sportsperson), a nickname for young participants in extreme sports
 Grom, Warmian-Masurian Voivodeship (north Poland)
 River Grom, England